Mound Branch is a stream in Bates County in the U.S. state of Missouri.

Mound Creek owes its name to mounds along its course.

See also
List of rivers of Missouri

References

Rivers of Bates County, Missouri
Rivers of Missouri